The Trzciniec culture is a Bronze-Age archaeological culture in East-Central Europe (c. 1600 – 1200 BC). It is sometimes associated with the Komariv neighbouring culture, as the Trzciniec-Komariv culture.

History
The Trzciniec culture developed from three Corded Ware-related cultures: Mierzanowice, Strzyżów and Iwno.

The areal of the Trzciniec culture corresponds to parts of today's Poland (including Kujawy, Małopolska, Mazowsze, South Podlasie) and western Ukraine.

The Trzciniec culture was succeeded by the Lusatian culture, which developed around Łódź.

Characteristics
The best known settlements of the Trzciniec culture were in Złota Pińczowska, Więcławice Świętokrzyskie, Goszyce, and west Bondyrz, close to the kurgans of Guciów. Some of these sites include important treasures containing materials such as ornamental gold and silver like in Stawiszyce and Rawa Mazowiecka.

Inhumation and cremation in a flat grave were important features of Trzciniec culture. Cases of inhumation were discovered in Wolica Nowa, in the form of kurgans. Evidence of kurgan inhumation have been found at Łubna-Jakusy, whereas kurgan cremation has been found at Guciów.

There is evidence for the use of chariots by the Trzciniec culture.

Genetics
Mittnik et al. (2018) examined the remains of seven possible Trzciniec individuals buried in Turlojiškė, Lithuania between 2,100 BC and 600 BC. The three samples of Y-DNA extracted belonged to haplogroup R1a1a1b (two samples) and CT, while the seven samples of mtDNA extracted belonged to haplogroup U5a2a1, T2b (three samples), H5, H4a1a1a3, and H.

Juras et al. (2020) examined the mtDNA of eighty individuals ascribed to the Trzciniec culture. The individuals were determined to be closely related to peoples of the Corded Ware culture, Bell Beaker culture, Únětice culture, and the Mierzanowice culture. They were notably genetically different from peoples of the neighboring Strzyżów culture, which displayed closer genetic relations to cultures further east.

Gallery

See also

 Nordic Bronze Age
 Srubnaya culture
 Tumulus culture
 Andronovo culture

References

Bibliography

 
 
 Prahistoria Ziem Polskich, tom IV pod redakcją W. Hensla Wydawnictwo PAN, Ossolineum, Wrocław, Warszawa, Kraków, Gdańsk, 1979.
 Pradzieje ziem polskich, tom I cz. 2 Epoka Brązu i początki Epoki Żelaza pod redakcją Kmiecińskiego, wyd. PWN Warszawa-Łodź 1989
 Wielka Historia Polski, tom I Najdawniejsze dzieje ziem polskich (do VII w.), Piotr Kaczanowski, Janusz K. Kozłowski, wyd. Fogra Kraków 1998
 Od neolityzacji do początków epoki brązu przemiany kulturowe w międzyrzeczu Odry i Dniepru VI i II tys. przed Chr. – praca zbiorowa pod redakcja Janusza Czebreszuka, Mikoly Kryvalceviča, Przemysława Makarowicza, Uniwersytet im. Adama Mickiewicza w Poznaniu. Instytut Prahistorii. Poznań : Wydaw. Poznańskie, 2001
 Encyklopedia historyczna świata tom I: Prehistoria, praca zbiorowe, opracowanie naukowe prof. Dr hab. Janusz K. Kozłowski, Agencja Publicystyczno-Wydawnicza Oppress, Kraków 1999
 Kultura pradziejowa na ziemiach Polski zarys, Jerzy Gąssowski, PWN, Warszawa 1985

Archaeological cultures of Central Europe
Archaeological cultures of Eastern Europe
Slavic archaeological cultures
Bronze Age cultures of Europe
Archaeological cultures in Ukraine
Archaeological cultures in Belarus
Archaeological cultures in Lithuania
Archaeological cultures in Poland